Richard Louis (born January 6, 1964) is a retired Barbadian sprinter who specialized in the 400 metres.

Career

He was awardeded the Austin Sealy Trophy for the most outstanding athlete of the 1980 CARIFTA Games winning 2 gold (200m, 400m) and 1 silver (100m) medals in the youth (U-17) category.

He won the silver medal at the Central American and Caribbean Junior Championships in 1982.

At the 1984 Olympic Games he finished seventh in the 4 x 400 metres relay, together with teammates David Peltier, Clyde Edwards and Elvis Forde. Their time of 3:01.60 minutes is still the Barbadian record.

Louis also competed in the individual distance at the 1984 Olympics, and both in relay and individually at the 1988 Olympic Games

Achievements

References

External links
sports-reference

1964 births
Living people
Barbadian male sprinters
Athletes (track and field) at the 1982 Commonwealth Games
Commonwealth Games competitors for Barbados
Athletes (track and field) at the 1984 Summer Olympics
Athletes (track and field) at the 1988 Summer Olympics
Olympic athletes of Barbados